Yaakov Rechter (14 June 1924 – 26 February 2001)   was an Israeli architect and an Israel Prize recipient.

Biography 
Yaakov Rechter was born to Paula Singer and the architect Zeev Rechter on 14 June 1924 in Tel Aviv. He grew up in his father's house which was used as a culture center in Tel Aviv. He studied architecture at the Technion – Israel Institute of Technology, Haifa. In 1952 he joined his father's office of architects. Rechter was married twice, to Sara Shafir and to the actress Hana Maron. He is the father of five children: the musician and composer Yoni Rechter, the philosopher Ophra Rechter, the Illustrator Michal Loit, the architect Amnon Rechter and the actress Dafna Rechter.

Notable buildings

Public buildings

Charles Bronfman Auditorium, Tel Aviv, 1957
Helena Rubinstein Pavilion for Contemporary Art, Tel Aviv, 1952-1959
Herzliya Museum of Art, 1975
Tel Aviv Performing Arts Center, 1994
Atarim Square, Tel Aviv, 1975
National Jewish Center for Learning and Leadership, Tel Aviv, 1976
Central Library, Mount Scopus Campus, Hebrew University of Jerusalem, 1981
Carmel Hospital, Haifa
Cameri Theater, Tel Aviv
Kaplan Medical Center in Rehovot, 1953

Hotels

Mivtachim Sanitarium, Zikhron Ya'akov, 1966
Hasharon, Herzliya Pituach, 1961
Tel Aviv Hilton, 1965
Herods Tel Aviv Hotel, 1972
Jerusalem Hilton (now VERT Jerusalem), Jerusalem, 1974
Sheraton Tel Aviv Hotel, 1977
Carlton Tel Aviv, 1980
King Solomon Sheraton Hotel (now King Solomon Hotel), Jerusalem, 1981 
Laromme Hotel (now Inbal Jerusalem Hotel), Jerusalem 1982
Holiday Inn, Ashkelon, 1998

Awards 
 Rokach Prize - given for "Gan Jacob", 1965.
 Israel Prize of Architecture - given for Rechter's design for the Mivtachim Sanitarium in Zikhron Ya'akov, 1972.
 The Arie El-Hanani Prize, Integration of Art and Architecture - given for the combination of art in construction, 1983.

See also
List of Israel Prize recipients\
Architecture of Israel

References

External links

Israeli architects
Technion – Israel Institute of Technology
Technion – Israel Institute of Technology alumni
Israeli Jews
Israeli people of Ukrainian-Jewish descent
1924 births
2001 deaths